The 2012 Florida Tarpons season was the first season for the Ultimate Indoor Football League (UIFL) franchise.

Schedule
Key:

Regular season
All start times are local to home team

Postseason

Standings

y - clinched conference title
x - clinched playoff spot

Roster

References

Florida Tarpons
Florida Tarpons
Florida Tarpons